Luciano Daniel Castro (born 16 March 1975) is an Argentine actor. He has worked as the lead actor in several successful telenovelas, such as Valientes, Herederos de una venganza and Sos mi hombre.

Biography 
He was born in the Buenos Aires, Argentina neighborhood of Villa del Parque. His father was  goalkeeper of Club Atlético Chacarita Juniors. He also as an archer made the inferiors in Club Parque and in Asociación Atlético Argentinos Juniors until the Seventh Division and became pre-selected of the Argentine U20 Team.

Career 
Luciano Castro first worked in television in the game show Jugate Conmigo when he was aged 18, in the sketches and games, and singing songs like "Bella" and "Mía". He was initially known simply as "Luciano". He won the golden "Jugate Conmigo" award in the program. He was the lead actor of the 2007 telenovela Lalola, along with Carla Peterson. He received the Martín Fierro Award to the best actor, and the telenovela got the majority of awards, including the golden one. The next year he was the lead actor of Amanda O, along with Natalia Oreiro. This telenovela was made for internet, and summaries of it were aired weekly on television. Luciano Castro, Mariano Martínez and Gonzalo Heredia were the lead actors of the 2009 telenovela Valientes, that became the most successful telenovela of Pol-ka with an average of 27.3 rating points. Initially, Castro did not like the idea, but producer Adrián Suar convinced him to work in the telenovela. The format of three lead actors and three lead actresses was similar to the one used in the Colombian Pasión De Gavilanes. He worked in the 2011 telenovela Herederos de una venganza, with the actress Romina Gaetani. This telenovela was shot in a filming set in Pilar. Lobo, a 2012 telenovela starred by Gonzalo Heredia, was cancelled after a short time because of its low ratings. Luciano Castro was called to make a new telenovela to replace it, Sos mi hombre. He was reluctant to do that, as he is a friend of Heredia and had other projects, but his contract gave priority to the works with Pol-Ka.

Since September 2022, Castro began to star in the series El buen retiro, produced by Kuarzo Entertainment Argentina and in which he made his first frontal nude where he showed his genitals.

Personal life
In 2002, his first son, Mateo was born. He was in a relationship with the radio host Elizabeth Vernaci for 4 years. Since 2010 he was in a relationship with Sabrina Rojas, with whom he had his daughter, Esperanza Castro, born on June 15, 2013 and his son, Fausto Castro, born on January 7, 2015.

Filmography

Television

Theater

Movies

Awards and nominations

References

External links
 

Argentine male actors
Living people
People from Buenos Aires
1975 births